Anne Michelle Baranger is an American chemist who is Professor of Chemistry at the University of California, Berkeley. She is the Associate Dean for Diversity, Equity, and Inclusion. Her research considers the experiences of chemistry students and ways to increase the number of students studying STEM subjects.

Early life and education 
Baranger was born to a family of scientists. Her grandfather, Harold Urey, was a renowned physical chemist and Nobel Laureate, and her parents, Elizabeth Baranger and Michel Baranger, were physicists, as is her brother. She was an undergraduate student at the Massachusetts Institute of Technology, where she majored in chemistry. She moved to the University of California, Berkeley for graduate studies, where she worked alongside Robert Bergman. After earning her doctorate, Baranger joined the lab of Alanna Schepartz at Yale University. She held both a Rudolph Anderson Postdoctoral Fellowship and a Donaghue Foundation Postdoctoral Fellowship.

Research and career 
Baranger joined the faculty at the Wesleyan University in 1996. She spent 10 years at Wesleyan, before moving to the University of Illinois Urbana-Champaign. In Chicago, Baranger was made Associate Head of the Chemistry department. She was part of the i-STEM education initiative, and worked on evaluating science teaching. She worked on biophysical processes involving RNA. She moved to University of California, Berkeley as Director of Undergraduate Chemistry in 2011. In 2020 she became the first Associate Dean for Diversity, Equity, and Inclusion at the College of Chemistry.

Baranger's research considers chemistry education and the development of evidence-based educational practices. She hopes to improve the experience of chemistry majors and increase the number of students in science, technology, engineering, and mathematics fields. In particular, she is interested in strategies to improve the quality of chemistry education and integrate green chemistry in laboratory instructions. She has worked to improve sense of belonging in chemistry departments.

Awards and honors 
 2002 Alfred P. Sloan Research Fellowship
 2015 American Chemical Society Committee on Environmental Improvement Award
 2016 Alfred P. Sloan Foundation Foundation Fellowship

Selected publications

References 

Living people
University of California, Berkeley alumni
Massachusetts Institute of Technology alumni
University of California, Berkeley faculty
American women chemists
20th-century American chemists
21st-century American chemists
Year of birth missing (living people)
20th-century American women scientists
21st-century American women scientists